The Modern Game is a breed of ornamental chicken which originated in England between 1850 and 1900. Purely an exhibition bird, Modern Game were developed to be most aesthetically pleasing and to epitomize the visual appeal of the gamecock or fighting cock.

History 

After cockfighting was made illegal in Britain in 1849, many cockfighting enthusiasts turned to breeding for shows as an alternative poultry hobby, and the Modern Game was developed from crosses of Old English Game and Malays. Despite being classified as game chickens (i.e. of cockfighting derivation) in breed standards, Modern Game were not bred to fight.

Game, as they were then called, were included in nine colours in the Standard of Excellence in Exhibition Poultry, the first edition of the British Poultry Standard, in 1865; a Game bantam was also included. Eight colours of Game were included in the first edition of the Standard of Perfection of the American Poultry Association in 1874.

Characteristics

Today, the ideal show bird should have a body shaped like a flat iron when seen from above, a relatively short back, fine tail, hard feathering, and a very upright carriage. The breed appears in more than a dozen colour variations. The most common being black red, birchen, brown red, duckwing and pyle. The colours can be broadly divided into two groups; those with willow-coloured legs and red eyes, and those with black legs and dark eyes. The colour of the skin, comb, and wattles varies from red to mulberry depending on variety, but all have a small single comb. Combs and wattles are required to be dubbed (cut off) of all cocks, and any cockerels being shown after November 1st, in order to compete in showing in some countries, which reflects their descent from fighting birds.

As in many breeds, there are both standard and bantam sizes of Modern Game. According to the standard of the Poultry Club of Great Britain, standard-sized cocks weigh  and hens , while bantams weigh  and  respectively. The bantam version is the most popular among poultry fanciers.

Use

Modern Game are not good egg layers, nor are they valued for meat production. They are almost exclusively kept by competitive breeders. In temperament, they are friendly and curious towards people, and are easily tamed.   For this reason the Modern Game is considered a suitable pet for the suburban poultry keeper.

References

Further reading

 

Chicken breeds
Chicken breeds originating in the United Kingdom
Animal breeds on the RBST Watchlist